Surface metrology is the measurement of small-scale features on surfaces, and is a branch of metrology. Surface primary form, surface fractality, and surface finish (including surface roughness) are the parameters most commonly associated with the field. It is important to many disciplines and is mostly known for the machining of precision parts and assemblies which contain mating surfaces or which must operate with high internal pressures.

Surface finish may be measured in two ways: contact and non-contact methods. Contact methods involve dragging a measurement stylus across the surface; these instruments are called profilometers. Non-contact methods include: interferometry, digital holography, confocal microscopy, focus variation, structured light, electrical capacitance, electron microscopy, photogrammetry and non-contact profilometers.

Overview
The most common method is to use a diamond stylus profilometer. The stylus is run perpendicular to the lay of the surface. The probe usually traces along a straight line on a flat surface or in a circular arc around a cylindrical surface. The length of the path that it traces is called the measurement length. The wavelength of the lowest frequency filter that will be used to analyze the data is usually defined as the sampling length. Most standards recommend that the measurement length should be at least seven times longer than the sampling length, and according to the Nyquist–Shannon sampling theorem it should be at least two times longer than the wavelength of interesting features. The assessment length or evaluation length is the length of data that will be used for analysis. Commonly one sampling length is discarded from each end of the measurement length. 3D measurements can be made with a profilometer by scanning over a 2D area on the surface.

The disadvantage of a profilometer is that it is not accurate when the size of the features of the surface are close to the same size as the stylus. Another disadvantage is that profilometers have difficulty detecting flaws of the same general size as the roughness of the surface. There are also limitations for non-contact instruments. For example, instruments that rely on optical interference cannot resolve features that are less than some fraction of the operating wavelength. This limitation can make it difficult to accurately measure roughness even on common objects, since the interesting features may be well below the wavelength of light. The wavelength of red light is about 650 nm, while the average roughness, (Ra) of a ground shaft might be 200 nm.

The first step of analysis is to filter the raw data to remove very high frequency data (called "micro-roughness") since it can often be attributed to vibrations or debris on the surface. Filtering out the micro-roughness at a given cut-off threshold also allows to bring closer the roughness assessment made using profilometers having different stylus ball radius e.g. 2 µm and 5 µm radii. Next, the data is separated into roughness, waviness and form. This can be accomplished using reference lines, envelope methods, digital filters, fractals or other techniques. Finally, the data is summarized using one or more roughness parameters, or a graph. In the past, surface finish was usually analyzed by hand. The roughness trace would be plotted on graph paper, and an experienced machinist decided what data to ignore and where to place the mean line. Today, the measured data is stored on a computer, and analyzed using methods from signal analysis and statistics.

Equipment

Contact (tactile measurement)

Stylus-based contact instruments have the following advantages:
 The system is very simple and sufficient for basic roughness, waviness or form measurement requiring only 2D profiles (e.g. calculation of the Ra value).
 The system is never lured by the optical properties of a sample (e.g. highly reflective, transparent, micro-structured).
 The stylus ignores the oil film covering many metal components during their industrial process.

Technologies:

 Contact Profilometers – traditionally use a diamond stylus and work like a phonograph.
 Atomic force microscope are sometimes also considered contact profilers operating at atomic scale.

Non-contact (optical microscopes)
Optical measurement instruments have some advantages over the tactile ones as follows:
 no touching of the surface (the sample can not be damaged)
 the measurement speed is usually much higher (up to a million 3D points can be measured in a second)
 some of them are genuinely built for 3D surface topography rather than single traces of data
 they can measure surfaces through transparent medium such as glass or plastic film
 non-contact measurement may sometimes be the only solution when the component to measure is very soft (e.g. pollution deposit) or very hard (e.g. abrasive paper).

Vertical scanning:

 Coherence scanning interferometry
 Confocal microscopy
 Focus variation
 Confocal chromatic aberration

Horizontal scanning:

 Scanning laser microscope (SLM)
 Structured-light scanning
Non-scanning
 Digital holographic microscopy

Choice of the right measurement instrument
Because every instrument has advantages and disadvantages the operator must choose the right instrument depending on the measurement application. In the following some advantages and disadvantages to the main technologies are listed:
 Interferometry: This method has the highest vertical resolution of any optical technique and lateral resolution equivalent to most other optical techniques except for confocal which has better lateral resolution. Instruments can measure very smooth surfaces using phase shifting interferometry (PSI) with high vertical repeatability; such systems can be dedicated for measuring large parts (up to 300mm) or microscope-based.  They can also use coherence scanning interferometry (CSI) with a white-light source to measure steep or rough surfaces, including machined metal, foam, paper and more. As is the case with all optical techniques, the interaction of light with the sample for this instruments is not fully understood. This means that measurement errors can occur especially for roughness measurement.
 Digital Holography: this method provides 3D topography with a similar resolution as interferometry. Moreover, as it is a non-scanning technique, it ideal for the measurement of moving samples, deformable surfaces, MEMS dynamics, chemical reactions, the effect of magnetic or electrical field on samples, and measurement of the presence of vibrations, in particular for quality control.:
 Focus variation: This method delivers color information, can measure on steep flanks and can measure on very rough surfaces. The disadvantage is that this method can not measure on surfaces with a very smooth surface roughness like a silicon wafer. The main application is metal (machined parts and tools), plastic or paper samples.
 Confocal microscopy: this method has the advantage of high lateral resolution because of the use of a pin hole but has the disadvantage that it can not measure on steep flanks.  Also, it quickly loses vertical resolution when looking at large areas since the vertical sensitivity depends on the microscope objective in use.
 Confocal chromatic aberration: This method has the advantage of measuring certain height ranges without a vertical scan, can measure very rough surfaces with ease, and smooth surfaces down to the single nm range. The fact that these sensors have no moving parts allows for very high scan speeds and makes them very repeatable. Configurations with a high numerical aperture can measure on relatively steep flanks. Multiple sensors, with the same or different measurement ranges, can be used simultaneously, allowing differential measurement approaches (TTV) or expanding the use case of a system.
 Contact profilometer: this method is the most common surface measurement technique.  The advantages are that it is a cheap instrument and has higher lateral resolution than optical techniques, depending on the stylus tip radius chosen.  New systems can do 3D measurements in addition to 2D traces and can measure form and critical dimensions as well as roughness. However, the disadvantages are that the stylus tip has to be in physical contact with the surface, which may alter the surface and/or stylus and cause contamination. Furthermore, due to the mechanical interaction, the scan speeds are significantly slower than with optical methods. Because of the stylus shank angle, stylus profilometers cannot measure up to the edge of a rising structure, causing a "shadow"or undefined area, usually much larger than what is typical for optical systems.

Resolution
The scale of the desired measurement will help decide which type of microscope will be used.

For 3D measurements, the probe is commanded to scan over a 2D area on the surface. The spacing between data points may not be the same in both directions.

In some cases, the physics of the measuring instrument may have a large effect on the data. This is especially true when measuring very smooth surfaces. For contact measurements, most obvious problem is that the stylus may scratch the measured surface. Another problem is that the stylus may be too blunt to reach the bottom of deep valleys and it may round the tips of sharp peaks. In this case the probe is a physical filter that limits the accuracy of the instrument.

Roughness parameters 

The real surface geometry is so complicated that a finite number of parameters cannot provide a full description. If the number of parameters used is increased, a more accurate description can be obtained. This is one of the reasons for introducing new parameters for surface evaluation. Surface roughness parameters are normally categorised into three groups according to its functionality. These groups are defined as amplitude parameters, spacing parameters, and hybrid parameters.

Profile roughness parameters 
Parameters used to describe surfaces are largely statistical indicators obtained from many samples of the surface height.  Some examples include:

This is a small subset of available parameters described in standards like ASME B46.1 and ISO 4287.
Most of these parameters originated from the capabilities of profilometers and other mechanical probe systems. 
In addition, new measures of surface dimensions have been developed which are more directly related to the measurements made possible by high-definition optical gauging technologies.

Most of these parameters can be estimated using the SurfCharJ plugin  for the ImageJ.

Areal surface parameters 
The surface roughness can also be calculated over an area. This gives Sa instead of Ra values. The ISO 25178 series describes all these roughness values in detail. The advantage over the profile parameters are:

 more significant values
 more relation to the real function possible
 faster measurement with actual instruments possible (optical areal based instruments can measure an Sa in higher speed then Ra.

Surfaces have fractal properties, multi-scale measurements can also be made such as Length-scale Fractal Analysis or Area-scale Fractal Analysis.

Filtering 

To obtain the surface characteristic almost all measurements are subject to filtering. It is one of the most important topics when it comes to specifying and controlling surface attributes such as roughness, waviness, and form error.  These components of the surface deviations must be distinctly separable in measurement to achieve a clear understanding between the surface supplier and the surface recipient as to the expected characteristics of the surface in question. 
Typically, either digital or analog filters are used to separate form error, waviness, and roughness resulting from a measurement. Main multi-scale filtering methods are Gaussian filtering, Wavelet transform and more recently Discrete Modal Decomposition. There are three characteristics of these filters that should be known in order to understand the parameter values that an instrument may calculate. These are the spatial wavelength at which a filter separates roughness from waviness or waviness from form error, the sharpness of a filter or how cleanly the filter separates two components of the surface deviations and the distortion of a filter or how much the filter alters a spatial wavelength component in the separation process.

See also

External links
 Surface Metrology Guide

References 

Metrology